Joranda Road railway station is a railway station on Cuttack–Sambalpur line under the Khurda Road railway division of the East Coast Railway zone. The railway station is situated at Gadagovindpur, Rahangol, Dhenkanal in Dhenkanal district of the Indian state of Odisha.

References

Railway stations in Dhenkanal district
Khurda Road railway division